Christopher Hörl (born 30 August 1989 in Zell am See) is an Austrian alpine skier competing for Moldova. He competed in the 2018 Winter Olympics.

References

1989 births
Living people
Alpine skiers at the 2018 Winter Olympics
Austrian male alpine skiers
Moldovan male alpine skiers
Olympic alpine skiers of Moldova
People from Zell am See
Sportspeople from Salzburg (state)
21st-century Austrian people